Ridhwan Jamaludin is a Singapore international football player who plays for Gombak United.

Club career
Previously, he played for young Lions before he joined Gombak United.

International career
Selected for the National Team by Radojko Avramović for the national squad in the VFF Hanoi 2010 competition.  He is yet to earn his 1st cap.

References

Singaporean footballers
Singapore international footballers
Gombak United FC players
Living people
1985 births
Young Lions FC players
Singapore Premier League players
Association football wingers